Amorbia potosiana is a species of moth of the family Tortricidae. It is found on the mountain Cerro Potosí in Nuevo León, Mexico, at altitudes of about 2,000 meters.

The length of the forewings is about 12.4 mm. The ground colour of the forewings is light brown. The subbasal, median and subterminal fasciae are dark brown. The hindwings are beige with a light brown apex.

Etymology
The species name refers to Cerro Potosí, the type locality.

References

Moths described in 2007
Sparganothini
Moths of Central America